Year 1296 (MCCXCVI) was a leap year starting on Sunday (link will display the full calendar) of the Julian calendar.

Events 
<onlyinclude>

January–December 
 March 30 – Capture of Berwick: King Edward I of England storms and captures Berwick-upon-Tweed, sacking what is at this time a Scottish border town, with much bloodshed. He slaughters most of the residents, including those who flee to the churches.
 April 12 – King Mangrai the Great of Ngoenyang establishes a new capital by founding Chiangmai, and founds the Mangrai Dynasty, that will rule the Lanna Kingdom of Chiangmai from 1296 to 1578 (the 700th Anniversary Stadium will be built in remembrance of this foundation).
 April 27 – Battle of Dunbar: John Balliol's Scottish army is defeated by an English army commanded by John de Warenne, 6th Earl of Surrey.
 July 20 – Jalal ud din Firuz Khalji dies, and his nephew and son-in-law Ala-Ud-Din-Khalji comes to the throne of the Delhi Sultanate in Hindustan, becoming the most powerful ruler of his dynasty.

Date unknown 
 Boniface of Verona expels the Byzantines from their last remaining strongholds on Euboea.
 Chinese diplomat Zhou Daguan spends a year at the court of Khmer King Indravarman III at Angkor, and pens a journal setting forth his observations.
 approximate date – Tarabya, self-proclaimed king of Pegu, is defeated in single combat on war elephants by Wareru.

Births 
 August 10 – "Blind" King John I of Bohemia (d. 1346)
 December – Marjorie Bruce, Scottish princess, only daughter of Robert I of Scotland (d. 1316)
 date unknown
Charles of Taranto (d. 1315)
 Gregory Palamas, Archbishop of Thessalonica (d. 1359)
 Roland of Sicily, Italian nobleman (d. 1361)
 probable
Algirdas, ruler of Lithuania (d. 1377)
 Blanche of Burgundy, queen consort of France (d. 1326)
 Shi Naian, Chinese author (d. 1370)
 Tamagusuku, ruler of Chuzan

Deaths 
 February 8 – King Przemysł II of Poland (b. 1257)
 March 11 – John le Romeyn, Archbishop of York
 March 24 – Odon de Pins, French Grand Master of the Knights Hospitaller
 May – William de Valence, 1st Earl of Pembroke
 May 19 – Pope Celestine V (b. 1215)
 June 5 – Edmund Crouchback, 1st Earl of Lancaster, son of Henry III of England (b. 1245)
 June 27 – Floris V, Count of Holland (b. 1254)
 August 7 – Heinrich II von Rotteneck, prince-bishop of Regensburg
 August 9 – Hugh, Count of Brienne, French crusader
 October 9 – Louis III, Duke of Bavaria (b. 1269)
 November 1 – Guillaume Durand, French canonist and writer
 December
Isabella of Mar, Scottish countess, spouse of Robert I of Scotland
 Adam de Darlington, Bishop of Caithness (approximate date)
 date unknown
Philippe de Rémi, French lawyer and royal official (b. c. 1247)
 Campanus of Novara, Italian astronomer and mathematician (b. c. 1220)
 Dnyaneshwar, Hindu saint and poet (b. 1275)
 Jalal ud din Firuz Khalji, founder of the Khalji dynasty in India
 Tarabya of Pegu, self-proclaimed ruler
 Robert de Vere, 5th Earl of Oxford (b. c.1240)

References